Jiří Pelikán (7 February 1923 in Olomouc, Czechoslovakia – 26 June 1999 in Rome, Italy) was a Czechoslovakian journalist and member of parliament, then a member of the European Parliament for the Italian Socialist Party.

In 1939 he joined the Communist Party of Czechoslovakia in exile and took part in the Resistance in Czechoslovakia during the Second World War.

From 1953 to 1963 he assumed leading functions in the communist-led International Union of Students. Until 1968 he was the director of the Czechoslovak Television and a member of the parliament from 1964 to 1969.

He fully supported the Prague Spring and organized the first live debate in common with the Austrian television ORF. When the troops of the Warsaw Pact entered Prague on 20 August 1968 he organized the resistance among journalists. In 1969 he fled the Gustáv Husák regime and was given political asylum in Italy.

He was elected to the European Parliament for the Italian Socialist Party in 1979 and again in 1984.

After the Velvet Revolution of 1989, he became from 1990 to 1991 member of the Consultative Council of the President Václav Havel.

He died in Rome in 1999 after a long battle with cancer.

Bibliography
F. Caccamo, Jiří Pelikán a jeho cesta socialismem 20. století, Praha 2008, 
"Inventario del Fondo Jiri Pelikan", in: Quaderni dell’Archivio storico 8, Roma 2003
Jiří Pelikán, Io, esule indigesto. Il Pci e la lezione del ’68 di Praga, ed. Antonio Carioti, Milano 1998, 
Jiří Pelikán (ed.), Feux croisés sur le stalinisme: par des socialistes, les dissidents, des eurocommunistes, Paris, Revue politique et parlementaire, 1980, 
Jiří Pelikán, Il fuoco di Praga. Per un socialismo diverso, Milano, Feltrinelli, 1978
Jiří Pelikán, Socialist Opposition in Eastern Europe: The Czechoslovak Example, Palgrave Macmillan, 1976, 
Jiří Pelikán (ed.), Civil and Academic Freedom in the USSR and Eastern Europe, Nottingham : Spokesman Books, 1975, 
Jiří Pelikán, S'ils me tuent, Paris, Grasset, 1975, 
Jiří Pelikán (ed.), The Czechoslovak Political Trials, 1950-54: Suppressed Report of the Dubcek Government's Commission of Inquiry, 1968, Macdonald, 1971,  (2nd ed. Stanford University Press, 1975)
Jiří Pelikán (transl. by G. Theiner and D. Viney), The Secret Vysocany Congress: Proceedings and Documents of the Extraordinary Fourteenth Congress of the Communist Party of Czechoslovakia, 22 August 1968, A. Lane, 1971,

External links
Page on the website of the European Parliament

1923 births
1999 deaths
Politicians from Olomouc
Jewish Czech politicians
Communist Party of Czechoslovakia politicians
Members of the National Assembly of Czechoslovakia (1948–1954)
Members of the National Assembly of Czechoslovakia (1964–1968)
Members of the Chamber of the People of Czechoslovakia (1969–1971)
Prague Spring
Czechoslovak democracy activists
Czechoslovak exiles
Italian Socialist Party MEPs
MEPs for Italy 1979–1984
MEPs for Italy 1984–1989
Deaths from cancer in Lazio
Czech resistance members
Czechoslovak emigrants to Italy